José Antonio Santana Arencibia, known as José Antonio (born 15 February 1981 in Las Palmas, Canary Islands), is a Spanish retired footballer who played as a right defender.

Honours
Spain U17
Meridian Cup: 1999

External links
 

1981 births
Living people
Footballers from Las Palmas
Spanish footballers
Association football defenders
Segunda División players
Segunda División B players
Tercera División players
UD Las Palmas Atlético players
UD Las Palmas players
Gimnástica de Torrelavega footballers
UD Vecindario players
Elche CF players
Universidad de Las Palmas CF footballers
Spain youth international footballers